Acoustic is a compilation album of John Lennon demos, studio and live performances that feature his acoustic guitar work and was released in 2004. 
Although it failed to chart in the United Kingdom, Acoustic reached number 31 in the United States with sales of 27,858 copies, becoming John Lennon's best charting posthumous US release since 1988's Imagine: John Lennon soundtrack. It spent eight weeks on the chart.

In keeping with the overall theme of the album, the booklet contains the lyrics and guitar chords for each track, as well as a chord index on the last page.

Track listing
All tracks written by John Lennon, except where noted.
"Working Class Hero" – 3:58
"Love" – 2:30
"Well Well Well" – 1:14
"Look at Me" – 2:49
"God" – 2:38
"My Mummy's Dead" – 1:13
"Cold Turkey" – 3:26
"The Luck of the Irish" (Lennon/Yoko Ono) – 3:41
"John Sinclair" – 3:22
 Tracks 8-9 recorded live on 10 December 1971 in Ann Arbor, Michigan
"Woman Is the Nigger of the World" (Lennon/Ono) – 0:39
"What You Got" – 2:24
"Watching the Wheels" – 3:04
"Dear Yoko" – 4:05
"Real Love" – 4:00
"Imagine" (Lennon/Ono) – 3:08
 Recorded live on 17 December 1971 at the Apollo Theater, Manhattan, New York City, New York
"It's Real" – 1:04

Reception 

The album received much criticism from both critics and fans, as nine of the sixteen tracks had previously been released on the 1998 John Lennon Anthology box set, while the remaining seven recordings had been available on several different bootleg CDs for years.

Recording notes
Tracks 1-2, 4, 8-10, 12 & 15-16 first released on John Lennon Anthology 
Tracks 1-6 taken from 8-track John Lennon/Plastic Ono Band sessions (1970) 
Track 7 taken from home demo September 1969 
Tracks 8 & 9 taken from John Sinclair benefit concert (1971) 
Track 10 taken from home recording (1972)
Track 11 taken from June 1974 work-outs 
Tracks 12-14 taken from home recordings (1980) 
Track 15 taken from live performance at the Apollo (1971) 
Track 16 taken from home recordings (1979)

References 

Compilation albums published posthumously
John Lennon compilation albums
2004 compilation albums
Capitol Records compilation albums